Gilbert Robichaud (February 4, 1918 – June 24, 1997) was a Canadian politician. He served in the Legislative Assembly of New Brunswick from 1960 to 1967 as member of the Liberal party.

In 1963 he sponsored the passage of the charter of the Université de Moncton in the Legislative Assembly.

References

1918 births
1997 deaths